Malifaux is a skirmish-level miniatures wargame manufactured by Wyrd Miniatures involving gang warfare in the ruins of a city.  The setting of the game is centered around the city Malifaux, which can be discovered through a breach opening into another world.

Released at Gen Con in August 2009, Malifaux uses a card mechanic in lieu of dice. Numbers are randomly generated by drawing numbered cards (1–13, with a Red Joker representing 14 and a Black Joker representing 0) from a “Fate Deck”. The Fate Deck cards consist of 4 different suits similar to the suits of classic playing cards: “Masks” represent the similar suit of “Diamonds”, “Rams” represent “Hearts”, “Crows” represent “Spades”, and “Tomes” represent “Clubs”.  A number of mechanics in the game allow for manipulating the cards flipped from the Fate Deck, including each player having access to a "Control Hand" allowing them to "Cheat Fate" and replace any card flipped with a card from their hand. The Malifaux Core Ruleset is currently in its Third Edition.

The universe of Malifaux 

The fictional universe of Malifaux as presented in the rules books and the online Malifaux Record and Wyrd Chronicles is both a city-state and a world in a parallel dimension. It is also the setting for the role playing game Through the Breach. The first known breach (also called The Breach of The Great Boundary) to this world was created in 1787 after our own world was threatened by the decline of magic, and magicians looking for a new source of magic discovered a world separated from ours by a thin barrier. The creation of the breach destroyed the city around the ritual site, ripping the life force from its inhabitants and creating a new equilibrium between the two worlds. Beyond the breach the city of Malifaux was discovered, surprisingly similar to many of our own but devoid of inhabitants. The new world became a new frontier when crumbling mining towns around the city were rebuilt into boom towns in the search for and trade of soulstones, the source of magic. With exploration continuing in the decade that followed, hostile natives called Neverborn were encroached upon. Tombs were discovered and with them the magic of resurrection. Discovered too were intelligent machines powered by soulstone.

In 1797, the breach was destabilized by a blizzard, collapsing while smoke and battle sounds were heard Earthside. After turmoil the Guild was formed by those who had made the Breach in the first place, controlling the dwindling resource of soulstones left Earthside and preparing for its reopening. In 1897 the Breach spontaneously reopened. The Guild was ready and took control with the Breach and the reopened frontier fueling a new boom-trade in Soulstone.

The present is 1901 Earthside. The Guild's control is precarious. Lesser, unstable breaches have appeared. A significant number of the workforce have organized themselves in the Miners and Steamfitters Union and smuggling is rife.

The city of Malifaux 
Reclamation is underway, but large segments remain uninhabited, quarantined, and walled off to protect the human population. A railway runs through the breach and into Malifaux as well as to a few mining towns. The city is run by the Governor General appointed by the Guild.

The surroundings 
Around Malifaux human settlements are concentrated in boomtowns and pioneer towns.

Malifaux source books 
Each edition of Malifaux has provided numerous sourcebooks expanding upon the rules of the game and the stories of the world and its many characters.

First Edition 

 Malifaux
 Rising Powers
 Twisting Fates
 Storm of Shadows

Second Edition 

 Malifaux 2E
 Malifaux 2E: Crossroads
 Malifaux 2E: Shifting Loyalties
 Malifaux 2E: Ripples of Fate
 Malifaux 2E: Broken Promises

Third Edition 

 Malifaux 3rd Edition - Core Rulebook
 Malifaux 3rd Edition - Guild
 Malifaux 3rd Edition - Resurrectionists
 Malifaux 3rd Edition - Arcanists
 Malifaux 3rd Edition - Neverborn
 Malifaux 3rd Edition - Outcasts
 Malifaux 3rd Edition - Bayou
 Malifaux 3rd Edition - Ten Thunders

Factions 

Malifaux features eight factions led by different masters supplemented by different crews. Each master with their own keywords denote which models within the game are available to hire and have internal synergy.

The Guild 
The Guild is the law in Malifaux, exerting a fascist control over the city, and are more concerned with production and mining of soulstones, a material that enables wielders to perform supernatural feats, than they are with the safety of its inhabitants.  The Guild offers a mix of ranged and melee combat, making the Guild a rounded and even crew, and aesthetically has a number of Wild West motifs. The crew masters of the Guild are:
Sonnia Criid - Witch Hunter - A Guild master, Sonnia uses fire magic and her runic blade to hunt down illegal magic users and recover soulstones and other magical artifacts.
Lady Justice - Marshal - A Guild master, Lady Justice leads a group of Death Marshals against the undead and is loved by the populace as a protector of the people.
Perdita Ortega - Family - A Guild master, Perdita is a gunslinger who leads the Ortega family against native monsters that roam the lands outside Malifaux City.
Charles Hoffman - Augmented - A Guild and Arcanist master, Hoffman is a senior Guild official who commands multiple constructs in his crew and works secretly to end the fighting in Malifaux by working with the Arcanists.
Lucius Mattheson - Elite & Mimic - A Guild and Neverborn master and Secretary to the Governor General of Malifaux, Lucius works secretly to take over the Guild and take power for himself.
Nellie Cochrane - Journalist - A Guild master, Nellie is the Editor-in-Chief of the Malifaux Tattler and does not hesitate to expose the truth behind the happenings of the Malifaux universe, provided they show the Guild in a good light.
Cornelius Basse - Frontier - A Guild and Explorers Society master, Basse is working to secure his freedoms from the crimes of his family and works to bring Law and Order back to the fringes of Malifaux Society.
Dashel Barker - Guard- A Guild master, Dashel acts as the head of the Guild Guard, working to secure the populace within the city walls, provided there is not too much paperwork.

The Resurrectionists 
The Resurrectionists are necromancers who command forces of the undead.  Whereas other factions are concerned with collecting soulstones, the Resurrectionists loot the ruins of Malifaux for magical devices and tomes of knowledge.  They are very resilient characters in play, with the ability to absorb a lot of damage and to raise dead models as additional combatants. The crew masters of the Resurrectionists are:
Seamus - Redchapel - A Resurrectionist master, Seamus is an audacious and vile serial killer in the Malifaux universe, raising his victims, often harlots, from the dead to be a part of his entourage.
Molly Squidpiddge - Forgotten - A Resurrectionist master, Molly was once a journalist before being brutally murdered and raised by Seamus. Mysteriously, she had developed autonomy and seeks to shelter those other undead who find themselves free of a Master.
Jack Daw - Tormented - A Resurrectionist and outcast Master, Jack Daw is a mysterious force in Malifaux, often ravaging the towns and people which he finds are guilty of betrayal and torment. 
Kirai Ankoku - Urami - A Resurrectionist Master, Kirai is fueled by revenge over the loss of her fiancé, resulting in grief so powerful that it led her to break the barrier between life and death and summon a host of vengeful spirits to fight against her enemies.
Dr. McMourning - Experimental - A Resurrectionist Master, McMourning was once the Guild's coroner, but after being exposed for his experiments with dead bodies that come his way, he fled from the guild and is now on the run.
Reva Cortinas - Revenant - A Resurrectionist Master, Reva was discovered by a priest to have incredible powers to communicate with the dead, and now instills purpose in the undead, often resulting in feverish cultists worshiping her as a divine entity.
Albus Von Schtook - Transmortis - A Resurrectionist Master, Albus was once a professor until he was driven mad. Now, Albus acts as the Headmaster for the University of Transmortis, a macabre school of undead that kidnap and torture the citizens of Malifaux.
Yan Lo - Ancestor & Retainer - A Ten Thunders and Resurrectionist Master, Yan Lo was cursed to walk the paths between life and death for eternity before being returned to the material world, and later Malifaux, by his niece Chiaki.

The Arcanists 
The Arcanists are individuals who practice magic. The Miners and Steamfitters Union are run by one of Malifaux's prominent Arcanists, Ramos. The Miners & Steamfitters Union (M&SU) is an organization that represents the city's labor class. Arcanists are actually made up from different groups that range from the Order of the Chimera to the show girls of the Star Theater. Their primary strength is in the wide variety of spells they can cast, and they also boast a number of mechanical and elemental constructs as well as beast minions. Arcanists have a strong blend of ranged magic and mechanical tank front-men that makes them a formidable foe. The crew masters of the Arcanists are:

Charles Hoffman - Augmented - A Guild and Arcanist Master, Hoffman is a senior Guild official who commands multiple constructs in his crew and works secretly to end the fighting in Malifaux by working with the Arcanists.
Rasputina - December - An Arcanist Master, Rasputina was a strong willed woman who made a deal with a primordial being known as December, acting as the head of his Cult of cannibalistic Ice Witches.
Colette Du Bois - Performer- An Arcanist Master, Colette is the owner of the Star Theater, a playhouse that acts as a front for the Arcanists and their soulstone smuggling operations.
Marcus - Chimera - An Arcanist and Neverborn Master, Marcus was a professor who discovered the primal energies of the wilds of Malifaux, becoming a bestial and mystical shaman.
Toni Ironsides - M&SU - An Arcanist Master, Toni Ironsides is the current president of the MS&U, after having taken over from the previous President Victor Ramos, following his stepping down and subsequent arrest. 
Kaeris - Wildfire - An Arcanist Master, Kaeris wields a fiery temperament and hatred for the Guild. Now acting as head of the Arcanists, Kaeris has no-tolerance for the Guild's treachery, often leaving their operations in a smoldering heap.
Sandeep Desai - Academic & Elemental - An Arcanist Master, Sandeep was born in Guild-occupied India devoted to learning before his own master was arrested by the Guild. Since then, Sandeep had dedicated his life in a quest for arcane knowledge and took up his master's cursed Gada to fight the Guild's occupational control.
Mei Feng - Foundry - A Ten Thunders and Arcanists Master, Mei Feng is the Foreman of the Foundry, the working class group laying the track for the trains of Malifaux. Mei is focused on the health of her workers and will do what is in their best interest even if that means betraying those who have had her back.

The Neverborn 
The Neverborn are the native inhabitants of the Malifaux world.  They are nightmarish monsters who terrorize the human settlers in Malifaux.  Their existence is linked with a calamity that occurred in the world's ancient past.  They are known for their speed and abilities that confound their enemies.  They possess few ranged attacks but are very deadly in melee combat. The crew masters of the Neverborn are:
Nekima - Nephilim - A Neverborn Master, Nekima is the proud and boastful Queen of the Nephilim, seeking to destroy any humans wandering Malifaux so as to remove their tainted race from the realm.
Pandora - Woe - A Neverborn Master, Pandora is a youthful Neverborn who carries an ancient box of suffering and toys with the humans who live in Malifaux, killing all hope around her, leaving only despair.
The Dreamer - Nightmare - A Neverborn Master, the Dreamer is a young boy whose nightmares are transformed into reality, followed by a Neverborn monster called Nytmare, or as he calls him, "Lord Chompy Bits".
Euripides - Savage - A Neverborn master, Euripides is an ancient prophet who has descended from the mountains of Malifaux to play his part in Fate's unchanging plan.
Zoraida - Swampfiend - A Neverborn and Bayou Master, known as the Swamp Hag, Zoraida is a witch who has lived in Malifaux for so long that she has been twisted by its local environment and become privy to Fate's design.
Titania - Fae - A Neverborn Master, Queen of the Fae, and Keeper of the Old World. Titania is attempting to reclaim control of Malifaux as its rightful Queen and abolish everything else from Malifaux, whether human or tyrant.
Marcus - Chimera - An Arcanist and Neverborn Master, Marcus was a professor who discovered the primal energies of the wilds of Malifaux, becoming a bestial and mystical shaman.

The Outcasts 
The Outcasts are a group of smaller interests unassociated with the major factions in Malifaux. While they previously would lend their services to the other Factions in Malifaux, with the Governor General's ban on Mercenary work, they have begun to form into a semi-cooperative force working out of the Freikorps-run town of Freiholt. The crew Masters of the Outcasts are:
Victoria Chambers - Mercenary - As Outcast Masters, Viktoria Chambers and her doppelgänger sister are the head of a powerful mercenary force that seeks out artifacts, and are often toted as the deadliest duo in Malifaux.
Jack Daw - Tormented - A Resurrectionist and Outcast Master, Jack Daw is a mysterious force in Malifaux, often ravaging the towns and people who he finds are guilty of betrayal and torment. 
Leveticus - Amalgam - An Outcast Master, Leveticus is a scavenger who has discovered how to cheat death via soul transfer, and has spent his days working to expand his research and reach true immortality, even if it means embracing necromancy.
Hamelin - Plague - An Outcast Master, Hamelin, also known as the Tyrant Plague, is a master of disease and misfortune, spreading his deadly blight across the citizens of Malifaux, hoping to obtain enough power to truly ascend into a god-like being.
These high-trained and morally suspect soldiers are willing to work for anyone who will pay them.
Tara - Obliteration - An Outcast Master, Tara is the herald of the Tyrant Obliteration. Often working to bring-about her Master's goals, Tara focuses her magic on the Void, an endless dimension held outside of reality.
Parker Barrows - Bandit - An Outcast Master, Parker Barrows is the leader of the Barrows gang, a group of outlaws and bandits who rob from any group in Malifaux for profit.
Zipp - Infamous -  A Bayou and Outcast master, Zipp is the most feared Sky Pirate of all Malifaux, owning the sky-ship Infamy and raiding all the other Malifaux organizations with his pirate crew.

Ten Thunders 
Inspired by the Triads and Yakuza, the Ten Thunders spring from the Three Kingdoms (a unified Japan, China and Vietnam) and is led by the Katanaka clan after their exile from the Three Kingdoms. Having found a second smaller breach in the mountains of Tibet leading into Malifaux, the Ten Thunders have become a powerhouse of smuggling and crime within Malifaux City. The Crew Masters of the Ten Thunders are:
Shenlong - Monk - A Ten Thunders Master, Shenlong was possessed by the Dragon, a primordial being, after discovering his temple, a being who has now turned its sights towards Malifaux.
Misaki - Last Blossom - A Ten Thunders  Master, Misaki slowly gained the respect of the Ten Thunders, ultimately taking control of the organization after beheading her father in a duel.
Lucas McCabe - Wastrel - A Ten Thunders and Explorers Society Master, Lucas McCabe was an adventurous explorer who became even more reckless after his fiancée died. 
Yan Lo - Ancestor & Retainer - A  Ten Thunders and Resurrectionist Master, Yan Lo was cursed to walk the paths between life and death for eternity before being returned to the material world, and later Malifaux, by his niece Chiaki.
Jakob Lynch - Honeypot - A Ten Thunders Master, Jakob Lynch owns the Honeypot Casino. After making a deal to house a monstrous creature below his basement, Lynch found its magic enthralled his clientele, forcing them into an everlasting stay.
Asami Tanaka - Oni - A Ten Thunders Master, Asami experienced great pain in her entire life. When she became mortally wounded, she allowed a demon into her soul, granting her power in exchange for a ravenous hunger for life.
Youko Hamasaki - Qi and Gong - A Ten Thunders Master, Youko is the proprietor of the Qi and Gong, a Tea House nestled in the heart of the Little Kingdom, a neighborhood in Malifaux, where she primarily deals in secrets and information.
Mei Feng - Foundry - A Ten Thunders and Arcanists Master, Mei Feng is the Foreman of the Foundry, the working class group laying the track for the trains of Malifaux. Mei is focused on the health of her workers and will do what is in their best interest even if that means betraying those who have had her back.

The Bayou 
Originally included as part of the Outcasts faction, it was announced as part of the update to Malifaux Second Edition that the Gremlins, now Bayou, would be a faction of their own.  Natives to the lands around Malifaux, the Gremlins are a wild and rambunctious group. Their play style is characterized by often random acts that at times injure their own fellows as easily as their enemies. The Crew Masters of the Gremlins are:
Som'er Teeth Jones - Big Hat -  A Bayou Master, Som'er is a notorious Gremlin crime boss who works to lead his large family to power in the Bayou. He wears a big hat as a symbol of his authority over the other gremlins in his crew.
Ophelia LaCroix - Kin -  A Bayou Master, Ophelia was an ambitious gremlin before her crew was massacred by the Ortega family. Having stolen Perdita Ortega's hat herself, she now leads another crew of gremlins, causing trouble wherever she goes.
Mah Tucket - Tricksy -  A Bayou Master, Mah is the leader of the Bayou Bushwackers, a crew wanted for multiple counts of assault and battery. She uses cookware and is a formidable foe against her enemies.
Ulix Turner - Sooey & Pig -  A Bayou Master,  Ulix is a hog breeder, and the Master of hogs and all things hoggish.
Wong - Wizz-Bang -  A Bayou Master, Wong is one of the most eccentric Master of all of Malifaux, wearing blue robes and using theatrical firework displays to hide his powerful magical potential, which he plans to use against the Ten Thunders organization.
The Brewmaster - Tri-Chi -  A Bayou Master,  the Brewmaster discovered moonshine, and brews multiple variants of this cocktail within a group of fiercely loyal and independent gremlins known as the "Tri-Chi".
Zipp - Infamous -  A Bayou and Outcast Master, Zipp is the most feared Sky Pirate of all of Malifaux, owning the sky-ship Infamy and raiding all the other Malifaux organizations with his pirate crew.
Zoraida - Swampfiend - A Neverborn and Bayou Master, known as the Swamp Hag, Zoraida is a witch who has lived in Malifaux for so long that she has been twisted by its local environment and become privy to Fate's design.

The Explorer's Society 
Originally announced as part of Third Edition, much about the Explorer's Society is unknown.

Lucas McCabe - Wastrel - A Ten Thunders and Explorers Society Master, Lucas McCabe was an adventurous explorer who became even more reckless after his fiancée died. 
Cornelius Basse - Frontier - A Guild and Explorers Society Master, Basse is working to secure freedoms from the crimes of his family and works to bring Law and Order back to the fringes of Malifaux Society.
Lord Cooper - Apex - An Explorer's Society Master, Lord Justin Cooper is the founder of the Explorer's Society, though little has been revealed about his motives since his announcement as a new Master in Malifaux.
Nexus - Camdus - An Explorer's Society Master, Nexus is the primary host of the hivemind of the Camdus created by Titania. The parasites betrayed the Neverborn queen by infecting the Fae and was imprisoned as a result. When Titania awoke this also freed Nexus.
English Ivan - Dua, Umbra - An Explorer's Society Master, English Ivan is the leader of the Department of Ungentlemanly Affairs. He is not English and his real name is likely not Ivan. Supposedly a spy for the M&SU and Ramos, English Ivan's true allegiance was the DUA and now the Explorer's Society. After an artifact reclamation mission went bad, English Ivan was injured and the Explorer's Society saved him. The affair left him with powers over creatures of the Umbra.
Maxine Agassiz - EVS - An Explorer's Society Master, Maxine Agassiz is an accomplished inventor and heiress to a wealthy mining family. A prominent researcher of both science and the occult. Her study of the Burning Man has caused her to become increasingly more unstable.
Jedza - Seeker - An Explorer's Society Master, Jedza was one a living being who wandered the Earth. After centuries of wandering she realized she was given a gift to explore the world forever. She had traveled to Malifaux upon the first opening of the Breach and explored its depths even when the Breach closed.
Anya Lycarayen - Syndicate - An Explorer's Society Master,  Anya Lycarayen is head of Condor Rails, the company that runs Malifaux's rail lines. She inherited the ownership of the company when her father went missing.

References

External links 
 
 Wyrd Wyrd's Homepage

Miniature wargames
Fictional city-states
Wargames introduced in the 2000s